Resurrected is a 1989 drama film directed by Paul Greengrass in his directorial debut. Written by Martin Allen, and starring David Thewlis, it is based on the story of the British soldier Philip Williams. 

Resurrected premiered at the 39th Berlin International Film Festival in February 1989.

Plot 
Soldier Kevin Deakin is presumed dead and left behind in the Falklands but is accused of desertion when he reappears seven weeks after the Falklands War ends.

Cast 

 Tom Bell as Mr Deakin
 Rita Tushingham as Mrs. Deakin
 David Thewlis as Kevin Deakin
 Rudi Davies as Julie
 Michael Pollitt as Gregory Deakin
 Christopher Fulford as Slaven
 Ewan Stewart as Corporal Byker
 David Lonsdale as Hibbert
 Peter Gunn as Bonner
 William Hoyland as Captain Sinclair
 Mark Wing-Davey as Major Dunbar
 Gary Mavers as Johnny Fodden
 Kenny Ireland as Denzil Clausen
 Philomena McDonagh as Ileen Clausen
 Lorraine Ashbourne as Reeva
 Michelle O'hare as Nurse 1
 Steve Coogan as Youth 2

References

External links 
 
 

1989 films
1989 drama films
British drama films
Falklands War films
Films directed by Paul Greengrass
Films shot in Greater Manchester
1989 directorial debut films
1980s English-language films
1980s British films